The SS Schenectady was a T2-SE-A1 tanker built during World War II for the United States Maritime Commission.

She was the first tanker constructed by the Kaiser Shipbuilding Company shipyard at the Swan Island Shipyard in Portland, Oregon. The keel of the Schenectady was laid on 1 July 1942, the completed hull launched on 24 October, and she was declared completed on 31 December, six months after construction began and two and a half months ahead of schedule.

Hull fracture

On 16 January 1943, she was moored at the fitting dock at Swan Island, in calm weather, shortly after returning from her sea trials. Without warning, and with a noise audible for at least a mile, the hull cracked almost in half, just aft of the superstructure. The cracks reached down the port and starboard sides almost to the keel, which itself fractured, jackknifing upward out of the water as the bow and stern sagged to the bottom of the river. Only the bottom plates of the ship held. This was not the first of the war-built merchant fleet to fracture in this way – there had been ten other major incidents, and several more would follow – but it was perhaps the most prominent; it occurred in full view of the city of Portland, and was widely reported in the newspapers even under wartime conditions.

The cause of the fracture was not fully understood at the time; the official Coast Guard report gave the cause of failure as faulty welding, while the Board of Investigation considered factors as diverse as "locked-in" stresses, sharp changes in climate, or systemic design flaws. Defective welding became the most common explanation for these incidents, especially when later investigations uncovered faulty working practices at some yards, but even then it could only be clearly identified as the case in under half of all major fracture cases. Later research indicated that the failure method was probably a brittle fracture, caused by low-grade steel. This would become highly brittle in cold weather, exacerbating any existing faults and becoming much more liable to fracture.

Later service
She was repaired and successfully entered service in April 1943.

Details of her exact service are unclear, but it is known that she sailed from California on June 10, 1944, possibly for service as a fleet oiler. During the next year, she sailed to Australia, the Persian Gulf, New Zealand, the Marshall Islands, then Curaçao, back through the Panama Canal to the Marshall Islands, the Caroline Islands, the Admiralty Islands and finally Ulithi, before returning home to San Pedro, arriving on May 20, 1945. She participated in battle engagements in the Marshall Islands and at Ulithi.

Following the war, she was transferred to the National Defense Reserve Fleet in July 1946. In 1948, she was sold to the Diodato Tripcovich Shipping Corporation in Trieste, and renamed as Diodato Tripcovich. She was finally scrapped in Genoa in 1962.

References

 

Ships built in Portland, Oregon
Type T2-SE-A1 tankers
World War II tankers of the United States
1942 ships
Maritime incidents in January 1943